Contarinia is a genus of midges, small flies in the family Cecidomyiidae.

Description 
As cecidomids, adult Contarinia are flies with hairy wings and long antennae. Males have antennal flagellomeres equally binodose, with each node surrounded by one circumfilum. The palpi are four-segmented. The tarsal claws of the legs are simple. The wing costal vein is interrupted after its union with the radius or third vein.

Ecology 
Many species of Contarinia have herbivorous larvae that attack inflorescences, fruits, or buds of plants. They include a number of crop pests, such as C. nasturtii (attacks various parts of cruciferous plants), C. citri (attacks flowers of citrus), C. pisi (attacks flower buds of legumes), C. caryafloralis (attacks inflorescences of Chinese hickory) and C. pruniflorum (attacks flower buds of stone fruits).

Two species of Contarinia are the main insects to visit inflorescences of Artocarpus integer (and possibly other plants). They are attracted by "a fruit-like, somewhat unpleasant smell" produced by the inflorescences. The adult midges feed on mycelia of Choanephora fungus (thus they are fungivorous, not herbivorous), which infects the male inflorescences, and females also oviposit in male inflorescences. Midge larvae hatch from the eggs, develop while also feeding on the fungus, pupate and then emerge from male inflorescences. Female inflorescences are not infected by the fungus and so cannot be used by the midges to breed, but they still attract Contarinia midges. The midges are known to carry pollen, so they are believed to pollinate A. integer - a pollination mutualism mediated by a pathogenic fungus.

Species
The following species are recognised in the genus Contarinia:

 Contarinia acerplicans (Kieffer, 1889)
 Contarinia acetosellae (Rübsaamen, 1891)
 Contarinia achilleae Fedotova 1992
 Contarinia aconitifloris Stelter, 1962
 Contarinia acrocecis Stelter, 1962
 Contarinia acuta Gagne, 1984
 Contarinia aequalis Kieffer, 1898
 Contarinia agrimoniae Felt, 1907
 Contarinia ajaguzensis Fedotova, 1995
 Contarinia albotarsa (Felt, 1907)
 Contarinia allii Fedotova 1995
 Contarinia alloteropsidis Harris 1979
 Contarinia amenti (Kieffer, 1909)
 Contarinia ampelophila Felt, 1907
 Contarinia angreni Fedotova, 1993
 Contarinia anthobia (Löw, 1877)
 Contarinia anthonoma (Kieffer, 1890)
 Contarinia anthophthora (Löw, 1880)
 Contarinia aprilina Kieffer, 1901
 Contarinia arrhenatheri Kieffer, 1901
 Contarinia artemisiae Rübsaamen, 1917
 Contarinia asclepiadis Giraud, 1863
 Contarinia asperae Siddiqui, Najam & Deshpande, 2010
 Contarinia asperulae Kieffer, 1909
 Contarinia astragalicarpa Fedotova, 1991
 Contarinia atraphaxiflorae Fedotova, 1988
 Contarinia avenae Kieffer, 1901
 Contarinia baeri (Prell, 1931) 
 Contarinia baggendorfi Stelter, 1982
 Contarinia bajankolica Fedotova, 1997
 Contarinia ballotae Kieffer, 1898
 Contarinia balsamifera Felt, 1907
 Contarinia barbichei (Kieffer, 1890)
 Contarinia berulae Fedotova, 1992
 Contarinia beskokotovi Fedotova, 1996
 Contarinia betulicola (Kieffer, 1889)
 Contarinia bitensis (Kieffer, 1909)
 Contarinia bivalviae (Rao, 1952)
 Contarinia bothriochloae Harris, 1979
 Contarinia brassicola Sinclair, 2019
 Contarinia brizae Kieffer, 1896
 Contarinia bulliformis Gagné, 2008
 Contarinia bursariae Kolesik, 1995
 Contarinia calophacae Fedotova 1989
 Contarinia campanulae (Kieffer, 1895)
 Contarinia camphorosmae (Tavares, 1920)
 Contarinia canadensis Felt, 1908
 Contarinia capparis Fedotova, 1983
 Contarinia caraganae (Fedotova, 1990)
 Contarinia caraganicola Marikovskij, 1955
 Contarinia cardariae Fedotova, 1994
 Contarinia carolinae Gagné, 1993
 Contarinia carpini Kieffer, 1897
 Contarinia catalpae (Comstock, 1881)
 Contarinia caryafloralis Jiao, Bu & Kolesik, 2018
 Contarinia caudata Felt, 1920
 Contarinia cerasiserotinae (Osten Sacken, 1871)
 Contarinia cerriperda Skuhravá, 1991
 Contarinia chrysanthemi (Kieffer, 1895)
 Contarinia citri Barnes, 1944
 Contarinia citrina (Osten Sacken, 1878)
 Contarinia clarkei (Felt, 1908)
 Contarinia clematidis Felt, 1908
 Contarinia cockerelli (Felt, 1918)
 Contarinia coffeae Harris, 1970
 Contarinia coloradensis Felt, 1912
 Contarinia constricta Condrashoff, 1961
 Contarinia convallaria Rübsaamen, 1925
 Contarinia convolvulicola Fedotova, 1991
 Contarinia convolvuliflora Fedotova, 1991
 Contarinia coronillae Jane, 1978
 Contarinia coryli (Kaltenbach, 1859)
 Contarinia cotini Kieffer, 1901
 Contarinia craccae (Loew, 1850)
 Contarinia crispans Kieffer, 1909
 Contarinia cucubali Kieffer, 1909
 Contarinia cucumata Gagné, 2008
 Contarinia cuniculator Condrashoff, 1961
 Contarinia cybelae Kieffer, 1909
 Contarinia czalikovae Fedotova, 1996
 Contarinia dactylidis (Loew, 1851)
 Contarinia dalbergiae Mani, 1943
 Contarinia desertophila Fedotova, 1993
 Contarinia desertorum Marikovskij, 1961
 Contarinia dichanthii Harris, 1979
 Contarinia dichanthiumae Siddiqui, Najam & Deshpande, 2010
 Contarinia digitata (Loew, 1850)
 Contarinia dipsacearum Rübsaamen, 1921
 Contarinia divaricata Felt, 1908
 Contarinia echii (Kieffer, 1895)
 Contarinia elaeagniflorae Fedotova, 1988
 Contarinia enceliae (Felt, 1916)
 Contarinia erigeronis Kieffer, 1909
 Contarinia erucastris Fedotova, 1994
 Contarinia excavationis (Felt, 1908)
 Contarinia fagi Rübsaamen, 1921
 Contarinia festucae Jones, 1940
 Contarinia fimbristylidis Harris, 1979
 Contarinia fitchii Felt, 1912
 Contarinia flavolinea Felt, 1908
 Contarinia floricola (Oettingen, 1927)
 Contarinia floriperda Rübsaamen, 1917
 Contarinia florum Rübsaamen, 1917
 Contarinia forskalei Debski, 1918
 Contarinia galatellae Fedotova, 2003
 Contarinia galeobdolontis Kieffer, 1909
 Contarinia galii Kieffer, 1909
 Contarinia gei Kieffer, 1909
 Contarinia gemmae Maia, 2003
 Contarinia geonomae Gagné, 2018
 Contarinia glycyrrhizae Fedotova, 1983
 Contarinia goebeliae Fedotova, 1987
 Contarinia gossypii Felt, 1908
 Contarinia halimodendronis Fedotova, 1991
 Contarinia hedysari Fedotova, 1993
 Contarinia heptapotamica Fedotova, 1991
 Contarinia heraclei (Rübsaamen, 1889)
 Contarinia hongoi Gagné, 1993
 Contarinia hudsonici Felt, 1908
 Contarinia humuli (Theobald, 1909)
 Contarinia hydrangeae Shinji 1939
 Contarinia hyperici Barnes, 1952
 Contarinia hypochoeridis (Rübsaamen, 1891)
 Contarinia ilicis Kieffer, 1898
 Contarinia inouyei Mani, 1954
 Contarinia inquilina Rübsaamen, 1917
 Contarinia intrans Harris, 1979
 Contarinia inulicola Stelter, 1965
 Contarinia ishkovi Fedotova, 1997
 Contarinia istriana Janežič, 1980
 Contarinia jaapi Rübsaamen, 1914
 Contarinia jacobaeae (Loew, 1850)
 Contarinia johnsoni Felt, 1909 
 Contarinia jongi Kolesik, 2017
 Contarinia juniperina Felt, 1939 
 Contarinia juniperiramea Fedotova, 1985 
 Contarinia kanervoi Barnes, 1958
 Contarinia karataliensis Fedotova, 1994
 Contarinia karatavica Fedotova, 1994
 Contarinia kiefferi (Schlechtendahl, 1891)
 Contarinia kochiae Fedotova, 1998
 Contarinia kurenzovi Kovalev, 1972
 Contarinia lamii Kieffer, 1909
 Contarinia lamiicola Rübsaamen, 1915
 Contarinia lathyri Kieffer, 1909
 Contarinia lentis Aczel
 Contarinia lepidii Kieffer, 1909
 Contarinia lespedezifolia Kovalev, 1972
 Contarinia liliacea Wahlgren, 1957
 Contarinia lilii Kieffer, 1909
 Contarinia limonii Fedotova, 1992
 Contarinia lini Simova & Skuhravá, 2007
 Contarinia lolii Metcalfe, 1933
 Contarinia lonicerae Kieffer, 1909
 Contarinia lonicerearum (Löw, 1877)
 Contarinia loti (De Geer, 1776)
 Contarinia luteola Tavares, 1902
 Contarinia lycii Debski, 1918
 Contarinia lyciicola Fedotova, 1983
 Contarinia lycopersici Felt, 1911
 Contarinia lysimachiae (Rübsaamen, 1893)
 Contarinia maculipennis Felt, 1933
 Contarinia maculosa Felt, 1908
 Contarinia majanthemi (Rübsaamen, 1925)
 Contarinia mali Barnes, 1939
 Contarinia manii Harris, 2010
 Contarinia marchali Kieffer, 1896
 Contarinia martagonis Kieffer, 1909 
 Contarinia matusintome Haraguti & Monzen, 1955 
 Contarinia medicaginis Kieffer, 1895 
 Contarinia melaleucae Kolesik, 2017 
 Contarinia melanocera Kieffer, 1904 
 Contarinia melissitis Fedotova, 1992 
 Contarinia merceri Barnes, 1930
 Contarinia meristotropea Fedotova, 1993
 Contarinia minima  Kieffer, 1909 
 Contarinia molluginis Rübsaamen, 1889 
 Contarinia montana Fedotova, 1993
 Contarinia morindae Grover, 1966
 Contarinia moringae Mani, 1936
 Contarinia mucidus Fedotova, 1993
 Contarinia nasturtii (Kieffer, 1888) – swede midge
 Contarinia negundinis (Gillette, 1890)
 Contarinia nicolayi Fedotova, 1997
 Contarinia nitensis Fedotova, 1997
 Contarinia nitrariae Fedotova, 1988
 Contarinia nitrariagemmae Fedotova, 1988
 Contarinia nubilipennis (Kieffer, 1889)
 Contarinia obesa Felt, 1918
 Contarinia okadai (Miyoshi, 1926)
 Contarinia onobrychidis Kieffer, 1895
 Contarinia ononidis Kieffer, 1899
 Contarinia opuntiae (Felt, 1910)
 Contarinia oregonensis Foote, 1956 
 Contarinia orientalis (Rao & Sharma, 1977) 
 Contarinia ovipositosclera Fedotova, 1993 
 Contarinia oxytropeocarpi Fedotova, 1993 
 Contarinia oxytropiflora Fedotova, 1984 
 Contarinia partheniicola (Cockerell, 1900)
 Contarinia passlowi Harris, 1979
 Contarinia pastinacae (Rübsaamen, 1892)
 Contarinia pentaphylloidifolia Fedotova 1990
 Contarinia perfoliata Felt, 1908
 Contarinia peritomatis (Cockerell, 1913)
 Contarinia perplicata Fedotova, 1997
 Contarinia petioli (Kieffer, 1898)
 Contarinia phellodendrobia Kovalev, 1972
 Contarinia phytolaccae Plakidas, 2016
 Contarinia picridis (Kieffer, 1894)
 Contarinia pilosellae Kieffer, 1896
 Contarinia pimpinellae Tavares, 1902
 Contarinia piri Tavares, 1922
 Contarinia pisi (Loew, 1850) – pea midge
 Contarinia plicata Gagné, 1993
 Contarinia plumosi Harris, 1979
 Contarinia polygonati Rübsaamen, 1921
 Contarinia populi (Rübsaamen, 1917)
 Contarinia pratula Fedotova, 1993
 Contarinia pravdini Becknazarova & Mamaeva, 1981
 Contarinia prolixa Gagné & Byers, 1985
 Contarinia prosopidis (Mani, 1938)
 Contarinia pruniflorum Coutin & Rambier, 1955
 Contarinia psammophila Marikovskij, 1975
 Contarinia pseudotsugae Condrashoff, 1961
 Contarinia pulcherrima Kieffer, 1909
 Contarinia pulchripes (Kieffer, 1890)
 Contarinia pyrivora (Riley, 1886) 
 Contarinia quercicola (Rübsaamen, 1899)
 Contarinia quercina (Rübsaamen, 1890)
 Contarinia quinquenotata (Löw, 1888) – daylily gall midge
 Contarinia racemi (Stebbins, 1910)
 Contarinia ramachandrani (Mani, 1953)
 Contarinia ramicola (Rudow, 1875)
 Contarinia reaumuriae Fedotova, 1991
 Contarinia rhamni Rübsaamen, 1892
 Contarinia ribis Kieffer, 1909
 Contarinia roperi Harris, 1979
 Contarinia rosaecarpae Fedotova, 1992
 Contarinia rubicola Kieffer, 1909
 Contarinia rubsaameni (Kieffer, 1894)
 Contarinia rudbeckiae Plakidas, 2016
 Contarinia rumicina (Tavares, 1919)
 Contarinia rumicis (Loew, 1850)
 Contarinia salatica Fedotova, 1996
 Contarinia salicola Shinji, 1939
 Contarinia sambuci (Kaltenbach, 1873)
 Contarinia sambucifoliae Felt, 1907
 Contarinia saussureaflora Fedotova, 1996
 Contarinia scabiosae Kieffer, 1898
 Contarinia schlechtendaliana (Rübsaamen, 1893)
 Contarinia schulzi Gagné, 1972
 Contarinia scirpi Harris, 1979
 Contarinia scoparii (Rübsaamen, 1889)
 Contarinia scrophulariae Kieffer, 1896
 Contarinia scutati Rübsaamen, 1910
 Contarinia sehimae Harris, 1979
 Contarinia selevini Fedotova, 1984
 Contarinia sennicola Kolesik, 2000
 Contarinia sesami Grover & Bakhshi, 1978
 Contarinia setigera (Lintner, 1897)
 Contarinia shelahovi Kolomoets, 1986
 Contarinia shevtshenkoi Fedotova, 1991
 Contarinia silenei Tavares, 1916
 Contarinia silvestris Kieffer, 1897
 Contarinia solani (Rübsaamen, 1892)
 Contarinia soongarica Fedotova, 1994
 Contarinia sorbariaflora Fedotova, 2004
 Contarinia sorbi (Kieffer, 1894)
 Contarinia sphaerophysae Fedotova, 1984
 Contarinia spiraeaphaga Fedotova, 1988
 Contarinia spiraeina Felt, 1911
 Contarinia squamulicola (Stebbins, 1910)
 Contarinia stackelbergi Kovalev 1972
 Contarinia steini (Karsch, 1881)
 Contarinia subulifex Kieffer, 1897
 Contarinia symphyti Kieffer, 1909
 Contarinia tanaceti Rübsaamen, 1921
 Contarinia tecomae (Felt, 1906)
 Contarinia tephrosiae (Mani, 1944)
 Contarinia texana (Felt, 1921)
 Contarinia thalactri (Felt, 1907)
 Contarinia thermopsidis s Fedotova, 1993
 Contarinia thlaspeos Rübsaamen, 1910
 Contarinia tianschanica Fedotova, 1997
 Contarinia tiliarum (Kieffer, 1890)
 Contarinia tragopogonis Kieffer, 1909
 Contarinia tremulae Kieffer, 1909
 Contarinia trifolii Felt, 1907
 Contarinia tritici (Kirby, 1798) – wheat fly
 Contarinia trizni Fedotova, 1996
 Contarinia trotteri Kieffer, 1909
 Contarinia truncata Felt, 1908
 Contarinia turkmenica Becknazarova & Mamaeva, 1981
 Contarinia ubiquita Gagné 2001
 Contarinia umbellatarum Rübsaamen, 1910
 Contarinia utechini Fedotova, 1996
 Contarinia valerianae (Rübsaamen, 1890)
 Contarinia variabilis Rübsaamen, 1917
 Contarinia vera Fedotova, 1997
 Contarinia verna (Curtis, 1827)
 Contarinia vernalis (Felt, 1908)
 Contarinia veronicastum Fedotova, 2003
 Contarinia verrucicola (Osten Sacken, 1875)
 Contarinia viatica Felt, 1908
 Contarinia viburnorum Kieffer, 1913
 Contarinia viciocarpi Fedotova, 1993
 Contarinia vincetoxici Kieffer, 1909
 Contarinia virginianiae (Felt, 1906) 
 Contarinia viridiflava Felt, 1908
 Contarinia virosa Fedotova, 1996
 Contarinia viticola Rübsaamen, 1906
 Contarinia washingtonensis Johnson, 1963 
 Contarinia zauschneriae (Felt, 1912)
 Contarinia ziziphorae Fedotova, 1998
 Contarinia zygophylli Debski, 1918
 Contarinia zygophylliflorae Fedotova, 1990

References

External links

Cecidomyiinae
Cecidomyiidae genera
Taxa named by Camillo Rondani
Insects described in 1860